National School of Anthropology and History (in Spanish: Escuela Nacional de Antropología e Historia, ENAH) is a Mexican Institution of higher education founded in 1938 and a prominent center for the study of Anthropology and History in the Americas. It is part of Mexico's National Institute of Anthropology and History (INAH) and offers bachelor's and postgraduate degrees in Anthropology and its disciplines: Linguistics, Social Anthropology, Ethnology, Archaeology, Physical Anthropology, Ethnohistory and History.

External links
 Official website

 Map here

 
Universities in Mexico City
Public universities and colleges in Mexico
Research institutes in Mexico
Mesoamerican studies
Educational institutions established in 1938
1938 establishments in Mexico